Overdog is the fourth album by the Keef Hartley Band.

Track listing

1971 LP
Deram SDL 2 (UK), DES 18057 (US)

 "You Can Choose" – 5:28
 "Plain Talkin" – 3:23
 "Theme Song / Enroute / Theme Song Reprise" – 8:05
 "Overdog" – 4:20
 "Roundabout" – 6:06
 "Imitations From Home" – 3:34
 "We Are All The Same" – 4:41

Tracks 2, 3, 4, 7 recorded at Trident Studios in January 1971
Tracks 1, 5 recorded at Morgan Studios in October 1970
Track 6 recorded at A.I.R. in November 1970

All songs written by Miller Anderson, except:
 "Enroute", written by Keef Hartley and Gary Thain
"Imitations From Home", written by Keef Hartley

2005 CD reissue
Eclectic Discs ECLDCD 1026 
Same track listing as the 1971 LP with Bonus Tracks

Roundabout (Part 1) Single – 2:57
Roundabout (Part 2) SIngle – 4:18

Personnel

Keef Hartley Band
 Keef Hartley – drums, percussion
 Miller Anderson – vocals, guitar
 Gary Thain – bass guitar
 Mick Weaver – keyboards
 Dave Caswell – trumpet, flugelhorn
 Lyle Jenkins – tenor saxophone, flute

Additional musicians
 Johnny Almond – flute (track 3)
 Jon Hiseman – drums, percussion (track 3)
 Peter Dines – keyboards (track 5)
 Ingrid Thomas, Joan Knighton, Valerie Charrington – backing vocals

Technical
 Neil Slaven, Keef Hartley – producers
 Robin Black – engineer, Morgan Studios
 John Punter – engineer, A.I.R.
 Roy Thomas Baker – engineer, Trident Studios
 Keef Hartley, Peter Dunn – design
 Richard Sacks – photography

References 

1971 albums
Keef Hartley Band albums
Deram Records albums
Albums recorded at Trident Studios
Albums recorded at Morgan Sound Studios